The Prix Italia is an international Television, Radio-broadcasting and Web award. It was established in 1948 by RAI – Radiotelevisione Italiana (in 1948, RAI had the denomination RAI – Radio Audizioni Italiane) in Capri and is honoured with the High Patronage of the President of the Italian Republic. More than one hundred public and private radio and television organisations representing 57 countries from the five continents form and outline the community of the Prix Italia which is in continuous evolution. Unique in the world, among International festivals and prizes, is the organisational and decision-making body of the Prix. The delegates of broadcasting members decide and resolve the editorial outline and elect the President.

RAI is in charge and responsible of the organisation of the event, and the General Secretariat has its headquarters in Rome. Prix Italia is held in an Italian city of art and culture annually every September/October for a week, in collaboration with local authorities.  The event is an authentic and unique moment of gathering and professional debate about the quality of the programmes in competition. It is the right venue where one can collaborate, define agreements and express points of view with fellow colleagues of the media sector.

The public participates in the concerts, films, shows, previews, round tables, "all night out", master classes, radio and web events. Thanks to the "on demand" work stations, everyone can listen to and watch all the best worldwide programmes in competition.

The drive for quality and responsibility of the Prix Italia resulted in Signis (former Unda) (The International Catholic organisation for Radio and Television) having its own jury for the first time in 1997 Prix Italia's edition held in Ravenna. The three-member jury consisted of Victor Sunderaj, Secretary General of Unda, John McDonald, producer for Scottish Television, and Rita Lefevere, producer for Belgian Radio and Television (BRTN). The goal of this jury was the rewarding of a television programme that supported human dignity. The first award of Unda was given to the producers of Child Molesters: On the Trail of Sex Offenders. "The producers achieved more than the mere promotion of human dignity: they fought for it", explained the Unda jury in its motivation. Since 2002, the Unda jury has been changed into the SIGNIS jury.

History 
The Prix Italia was established in Capri in 1948. Originally dedicated only to radio works, starting from 1957 it also included television works, and from 1998, the competition has also awarded multimedia projects created on web digital platforms. Over the years it has been hosted in many of the most famous Italian cities of art.

The idea of an international radio award was proposed in 1948 by director general of Rai, Salvino Sernesi, the director of programmes Giulio Razzi and the director of the drama and revue sector, the playwright Sergio Pugliese. On 13 September of the same year in Capri, the delegations of fourteen radio organisations representing Austria, the Vatican State, Egypt, France, Great Britain, Italy, the Principality of Monaco, The Netherlands, Poland, Portugal, Sweden, Switzerland, Czechoslovakia and Trieste (which was then a free territory). On that same occasion, the regulations were drawn up and the international prize was officially established.

Festival Editions

List of laureates

 1955: Claude Aveline
 1956: Tony Schwartz
 1959: George Selwyn English
 1965: Raymond Raikes
 1966: Nigel Butterley
 1967: Krzysztof Penderecki
 1970: Bent Lorentzen
 1978: Roland Joffé
 1980: Marian Finucane
 Eric Salzman
 Tony Palmer
 1981: Tony Palmer
 1982: Luciano Berio
 1984: Peter Brook
 1989  Leslie Megahey
 1995: Jean-Louis Agobet (composer) – Special Prize
 1999: Stephen Poliakoff
 2001: Hannes Råstam
 2002: Filip Šovagović
 2003: Colin Black
 2005: Jonathan Mills
 2009: Jovanka Trbojević
 2010: Benjamin Dupé
 2013: Paolo Pietropaolo
 2016: Erik van Empel

References

Bibliography 

 Amelia Belloni Sonzogni, Cultura e qualità di rete. Storia del Prix Italia 1948 - 2008, UNI Service, 2008, .

External links
 Prix Italia website
 Prix Italia from IMDb

Italian television awards
Awards established in 1948
Radio awards
1948 establishments in Italy